Sebastian Albert Schindler (April 28, 1871 – June 17, 1931) was a member of the Wisconsin State Assembly.

Biography
Schindler was born on April 28, 1871. Among his children was Walter Schindler, who became a vice admiral in the United States Navy. He died of a heart attack on June 17, 1931.

Career
Schindler was a member of the Assembly during the 1913, 1915 and 1917 sessions. At the time of his death, he was Deputy State Treasurer. In addition, Schindler was President (similar to Mayor) of New Glarus, Wisconsin, a member of the County Board of Green County, Wisconsin and a school board president. He was a Republican.

References

People from New Glarus, Wisconsin
Republican Party members of the Wisconsin State Assembly
County supervisors in Wisconsin
Mayors of places in Wisconsin
School board members in Wisconsin
1871 births
1931 deaths